The 1938 Utah State Aggies football team was an American football team that represented Utah State Agricultural College in the Mountain States Conference (MSC) during the 1938 college football season. In their 20th season under head coach Dick Romney, the Aggies compiled a 4–4 record (3–3 against MSC opponents), finished fifth in the MSC, and were outscored by a total of 87 to 85.

Schedule

References

Utah State
Utah State Aggies football seasons
Utah State Aggies football